Triple is used in several contexts to mean "threefold" or a "treble":

Sports
 Triple (baseball), a three-base hit
 A basketball three-point field goal
 A figure skating jump with three rotations
 In bowling terms, three strikes in a row
 In cycling, a crankset with three chainrings

Places
 Triple Islands, an uninhabited island group in Nunavut, Canada
 Triple Island, British Columbia, Canada
 Triple Falls (disambiguation), four waterfalls in the United States & Canada
 Triple Glaciers, in Grand Teton National Park, Wyoming
 Triple Crossing, Richmond, Virginia, believed to be the only place in North America where three Class I railroads cross
 Triple Bridge, a stone arch bridge in Ljubljana, Slovenia

Transportation
 Kawasaki triple, a Japanese motorcycle produced between 1969 and 1980
 Triumph Triple, a motorcycle engine from Triumph Motorcycles Ltd
 A straight-three engine
 A semi-truck with three trailers

Science and technology
 Triple (mathematics) (3-tuple), a list or sequence with three elements
 Triple (category theory), a construction in algebraic topology, now usually called a monad
 Semantic triple, the atomic data entity in the Resource Description Framework (RDF)

Religion
 Triple deity, a deity who appears in three forms
 Triple goddess (Neopaganism), a divine female figure revered in Neopagan traditions

Other uses
 Triple (novel), by Ken Follett
 Triples (web series), a 2020 Indian web series
 Triples (cereal), a breakfast cereal made by General Mills in the 1990s
 A method of change ringing of bells
 TripleS (group), South Korean girl group

See also
 Triple point, in thermodynamics, the temperature and pressure at which three states of matter can co-exist
 Triple jump, a track and field event
 Triple metre, a musical metre characterized by a primary division of three beats to the bar
 Triple H, American professional wrestler
 Treble (disambiguation)
 Triplet (disambiguation)
 Tripel, a style of beer

3 (number)